Meine Freundin Sybille is an East German film. It was released in 1967.

Cast
 Rolf Herricht: Hurtig
 Hanns-Michael Schmidt: Ronny
 Evelyn Opoczynski: Sybille
 Eva-Maria Hagen: Helena
 Helga Göring: Mrs. Mücke
 Arthur Jopp: Sybille's father
 Marianne Behrens: Sybille's mother
 Wolfgang Luderer: director
 Gerlind Ahnert: director's wife
 Rolf Ripperger: Dr. Meier
 Klaus Bergatt: Benno
 Erika Stiska: Mrs. Siebenzahl
 Hanna Rieger: Mrs. Fülve
 Hans-Joachim Preil: chief guide
 Werner Lierck: guide
 Willi Narloch: taxi driver
 Hubert Hoelzke: Hubert

External links
 

1967 films
East German films
1960s German-language films
1960s German films